Lake Winnipesaukee Ice-Out occurs when all the ice on Lake Winnipesaukee, the largest lake in New Hampshire, has broken up after winter. Over the years this has been decided upon by a variety of means; as of 2018, Dave Emerson makes the call. Emerson flies two to three times a day over Lake Winnipesaukee to check on the ice. Ice-Out is declared when the MS Mount Washington can make it to every one of its ports: Center Harbor, Wolfeboro, Alton, Weirs Beach and Meredith. It is also considered the unofficial start to the boating season as well as the end of winter in New Hampshire. The earliest recorded ice-out occurred in 2016 on March 18, beating out the previous records of March 23, 2012 and March 24, 2010. The latest ice out occurred in 1888 on May 12.

Because the Ice-Out designation is based on the judgment of one person, it is unscientific. The call does not mean that the lake is entirely devoid of ice, nor does it mean that the MS Mount Washington actually does go to each of its ports. It simply means that it is believed that the ship could.

History
Ice-Out records have been kept since 1887 as a way to keep track of when both commercial and passenger transportation lanes became usable in the lake. In 1974, Dr. William K. Widgert compiled data from known records to create a list of past dates.

Originally the Ice-Out designation was decided by people on shore. Later, for roughly 50 years, the call was made by Bob Aldrich, then, starting in the early 1980s, it was called by Alan Emerson. Since his death in 2002 it has been exclusively called by his son Dave, except in 2003 when it as declared by flight instructor Steve Sydorwicz. 

Ice-Out has occurred earlier on average in the last two decades of the 20th century and the first of the 21st century than in preceding decades.

Contests 
There are two contests where the public can bet on when Ice-Out will occur on the lake. One is run by Public Service of New Hampshire and the other by Winnipesaukee.com.

Ice-Out dates

References

External links 
Ice-Out page on Winnipesaukee.com
Emerson Aviation, the service that makes the Ice-Out call
Lake Winnipesaukee Ice-In Report

Environment of New Hampshire
Ice-Out